Loveline is an American radio call-in show which has run from 1983 to the present.

Loveline may also refer to:

 Loveline (TV series), a 1996-2000 MTV series based on the radio show
 Loveline (Eddie Rabbitt album), 1979
 Loveline (Tavares album), 1981
 Loveline Obiji (born 1990), a Nigerian powerlifter

See also
 Lovelines, a 1989 album by the Carpenters
 Lovelines (film), a 1984 American comedy directed by Rod Amateau